Helen Jacobs defeated Hilde Sperling in the final, 6–2, 4–6, 7–5 to win the ladies' singles tennis title at the 1936 Wimbledon Championships. Helen Moody was the defending champion, but did not compete.

Seeds

  Dorothy Round (quarterfinals)
  Helen Jacobs (champion)
  Sarah Fabyan (first round)
  Kay Stammers (quarterfinals)
  Hilde Sperling (final)
  Simonne Mathieu (semifinals)
  Jadwiga Jędrzejowska (semifinals)
  Anita Lizana (quarterfinals)

Draw

Finals

Top half

Section 1

Section 2

Section 3

Section 4

Bottom half

Section 5

Section 6

Section 7

Section 8

References

External links

Women's Singles
Wimbledon Championship by year – Women's singles
Wimbledon Championships - singles
Wimbledon Championships - singles